Good Times is a 1967 American comedy musical western film starring Sonny & Cher. The film also co-stars George Sanders, Norman Alden, Larry Duran, Kelly Thordsen and Lennie Weinrib. The film marks the feature directorial debut of William Friedkin, who later directed The French Connection and The Exorcist.

Plot
Sonny and Cher appear as themselves in this spoof of various genres, including mysteries, westerns, Tarzan movies and spy thrillers. The plot revolves around a film contract offered to Sonny by powerful executive Mr. Mordicus, played by George Sanders, who also plays the antagonist in each of Sonny's ideas for the proposed film, which are played out in a number of skits featuring music and dancing by the star duo.

Cast
 Sonny Bono as Sonny
 Cher as Cher
 George Sanders as Mr Mordicus / Knife McBlade / White Hunter / Zarubian
 Norman Alden as Warren
 Larry Duran as Smith
 Kelly Thordsen as Tough Hombre
 Lennie Weinrib as Leslie Garth
 Peter Robbins as Brandon
 Phil Arnold as Solly

Production
Sonny Bono wanted to make a movie starring him and Cher and was introduced to William Friedkin, a young documentary filmmaker who had just moved into drama and who, like Bono, was represented by the William Morris Agency. They got along well and Abe Lastfogel managed to get Steve Broidy to agree to finance a movie.

Bono and Friedkin started reading through scripts and received a letter from a novice screenwriter Nicholas Hyams, who suggested Sonny and Cher make a film about them making a movie. Hyams was hired but Friedkin says the collaboration with him was not easy - "he was condescending to Sonny and disdainful of me." Hyams was fired and Friedkin and Bono wound up writing the script themselves based on Hyams' original idea. Broidy wanted to call the film I Got You Babe but Bono preferred Good Times, based on a song he was writing at the time. All songs in the film were released on a soundtrack album.

The film was originally meant to be made for $500,000 but the budget came in at $800,000. Broidy then sold the film to Columbia for $1.2 million, ensuring he was in profit before shooting even began.

Reception
Good Times received poor-to-middling reviews as a pastiche of so-so skits, though one critic credited veteran character actor Sanders for making the film "slightly less unbearable."

Friedkin later commented that "I've made better films than Good Times but I've never had so much fun".

Box office
The film earned $600,000 in rentals domestically and $200,000 internationally. After the distribution fee, prints and advertising and the negative cost were deducted, ABC reported a loss of $1,050,000.

See also
List of American films of 1967

References

Friedkin, William, The Friedkin Connection, HarperCollins 2013

External links
 
 
 

1967 films
1967 musical comedy films
American musical comedy films
American satirical films
1960s English-language films
Films directed by William Friedkin
Films about actors
Films about hypnosis
American independent films
Columbia Pictures films
ABC Motion Pictures films
1967 directorial debut films
1967 independent films
Sonny & Cher
1960s American films